Bolvanovo is a rural locality in Kosteltsevsky Selsoviet Rural Settlement, Kurchatovsky District, Kursk Oblast, Russia. Population:

Geography 
The village is located in the Prutishche River basin (in the basin of the Seym), 76 km from the Russia–Ukraine border, 40 km north-west of Kursk, 20 km north of the district center – the town Kurchatov, 6 km from the selsoviet center – Kosteltsevo.

 Climate
Bolvanovo has a warm-summer humid continental climate (Dfb in the Köppen climate classification).

Transport 
Bolvanovo is located 26.5 km from the federal route  Crimea Highway, 20 km from the road of regional importance  (Kursk – Lgov – Rylsk – border with Ukraine), 20 km from the road  (Lgov – Konyshyovka), on the road of intermunicipal significance  (38K-017 – Nikolayevka – Shirkovo), 20 km from the nearest railway halt Kurchatow (railway line Lgov I — Kursk).

The rural locality is situated 45 km from Kursk Vostochny Airport, 147 km from Belgorod International Airport and 247 km from Voronezh Peter the Great Airport.

References

Notes

Sources

Rural localities in Kurchatovsky District, Kursk Oblast
Fatezhsky Uyezd